Income and Corporation Taxes Act may refer to:

 Income and Corporation Taxes Act 1970, an Act of the Parliament of the United Kingdom
 Income and Corporation Taxes Act 1988, an Act of the Parliament of the United Kingdom